Francesca Lia Block (born December 3, 1962) is an American writer of adult and young-adult literature. She is known for the Weetzie Bat series, which she began while a student at UC Berkeley.

Early life

Block was born in Los Angeles to a poet and a painter. She attended UC Berkeley.

Career
Block writes both novels and poetry. Her first two books, Moon Harvest (1978) and Season of Green (1979), were small-press illustrated poetry collections, now out of print. Since then, she has released several standalone collections of poetry, as well as incorporating poetry and lyrics into many of her novels.

Block did not originally start out with an editor, but was published by using her connections. She attributed her success partly to publishers being interested in shorter books.

In 2014, Block was named Writer-in-Residence at Pasadena City College. Block is a member of the Authors Guild, Authors League of America, and the Writers Guild of America. Block's work has been translated into several different languages, including French, Italian, German, and Japanese, and is published around the world.

In 2018, it was confirmed that Weetzie Bat would be produced as a feature film, with Justin Kelly attached as director. Block wrote the screenplay for the film.

Block is known for her use of imagery, especially in describing the city of Los Angeles. One New York Times Book Review critic said, "Block writes about the real Los Angeles better than anyone since Raymond Chandler."

Personal life
Block has a son and a daughter.

Awards and nominations

 1996: Baby Be-Bop was nominated for the Lambda Literary Award for Young Adult/Children's Book
 2001: Dangerous Angels was inducted into the Gaylactic Spectrum Awards Hall of Fame
 2005: American Library Association (ALA) Margaret A. Edwards Award for "significant and lasting contribution to young adult literature" for the first five Weetzie Bat books.
 2009: Weetzie Bat won the Phoenix Award from the Children's Literature Association as the best English-language children's book that did not win a major award when it was originally published.

Bibliography

Standalone novels

Ecstasia (1993)
The Hanged Man (1994)
Primavera (1994)
I Was A Teenage Fairy (1998)
Violet and Claire (1999)
The Rose and the Beast (2000)
Echo (2001)
Wasteland (2003)
Ruby (2006)
Psyche In A Dress (2006)
Blood Roses (2008)
Quakeland (2008)
The Waters and the Wild (2009)
Pretty Dead (2009)
The Frenzy  (2010)
House of Dolls (2010)
The Elementals (St. Martin's Press, 2013)
Love in the Time of Global Warming (2013)
Teen Spirit (2014)
The Island of Excess Love (2014)
Beyond the Pale Motel (2014)
My Miserable Life (2016), as F.L. Block
Lost Children (2021), audiobook
House Of Hearts (Rare Bird Books, 2022)

See also

References

External links

Weetzie Bat Screenplay Reading
Save Francesca's Faerie Cottage
Francesca Lia Block at Library of Congress Authorities — with 38 catalog records

1962 births
Living people
20th-century American novelists
21st-century American novelists
American children's writers
American fantasy writers
American women short story writers
American women novelists
Margaret A. Edwards Award winners
Writers from Los Angeles
American women children's writers
Women science fiction and fantasy writers
20th-century American women writers
21st-century American women writers
Women writers of young adult literature
20th-century American short story writers
21st-century American short story writers